Ligia is a genus of isopods, commonly known as rock lice or sea slaters. Most Ligia species  live in tidal zone cliffs and rocky beaches, but there are several fully terrestrial species which occur in high-humidity environments.

Ecology

Coastal Ligia species exhibit a mixture of terrestrial and marine characteristics, drying out easily, needing moist air and proximity to water to retain water. While they have gills and can exchange gas under water, they only do so when escaping terrestrial predators or being dislodged by wave action. They do not move swiftly in the water and are open to marine predation. They are well adapted to rocky surfaces and avoid sand, which opens them to terrestrial predation and desiccation.

Taxonomy 
It has been suggested that Ligia is more closely to marine isopods than it is to true woodlice.

Species 
Species separation is at times difficult because of sexual dimorphism. For example, males usually have longer and wider antennae than females. The males also tend to be larger but narrower, with the difference sometimes attributed to the female’s brood pouch. Complicating matters is the possible existence of cryptic species in the genus.

This is a list of all Ligia species contained in A Bibliography of Terrestrial Isopods:

Ligia australiensis – Australian slater, Australia, including Tasmania and Lord Howe Island
Ligia baudiniana – east and west coasts of the Americas
Ligia boninensis – Bonin Islands, Japan 
Ligia cajennensis – French Guiana
Ligia cinerascens – Hokkaido and northern Honshu, Japan, and the Kuril Islands
Ligia cursor – Chile
Ligia curvata – Angola
Ligia dante  – Hawai'i Island (Hawaii) 
Ligia dentipes – Andaman and Nicobar Islands, Indonesia
Ligia dilatata – southern Africa (Namibia and South Africa)
Ligia eleluensis – Maui, Hawaii 
Ligia exotica – wharf roach, introduced around the world in subtropical and warm temperate coastlines
Ligia ferrarai – Madagascar
Ligia filicornis – Venezuela
Ligia glabrata – Southern Africa (Namibia and South Africa)
Ligia gracilipes – west coast of Africa, Senegal to northern Angola
Ligia hachijoensis – Izu Islands, Japan
Ligia hawaiensis – Kaua'i, Hawaii 
Ligia honu – Hawaii Island, Hawaii 
Ligia italica – coasts of the Black Sea, Mediterranean Sea, Atlantic in northern Africa downsouth to Cape Verde and Macaronesia Islands
Ligia kamehameha – Hawaii Island, Hawaii 
Ligia latissima – New Caledonia
Ligia litigiosa – Chile and Peru and the Juan Fernández Islands
Ligia malleata – Tanzania
Ligia mauinuiensis – Maui Nui Islands and Oahu, Hawaii 
Ligia miyakensis – Izu Islands, Japan
Ligia natalensis – southeastern coast of South Africa from Knysna to Natal
Ligia novaezealandiae – New Zealand and Kermadec Island
Ligia occidentalis – California and Baja California
Ligia oceanica – Atlantic Coasts of Europe, coasts of western Baltic Sea and possibly introduced to the Atlantic Coast of North America
Ligia pallasii – Pacific Coast of North America, the Aleutian Islands to Santa Cruz, California
Ligia pallida – Christmas Island in Polynesia
Ligia pele – Maui, Hawai'i 
Ligia perkinsi –  Kaua'i and O'ahu, Hawaiian Islands
Ligia persica – Persian Gulf
Ligia philoscoides – southeastern Polynesia
Ligia pigmentata – Red Sea, Persian Gulf and coast of Somalia
Ligia platycephala – Venezuela, Guyana and Trinidad
Ligia rolliensis – Oahu, Hawai'i
Ligia rugosa – southeastern Polynesia
Ligia ryukyuensis – Japan
Ligia saipanensi – Saipan Island, Micronesia
Ligia simoni – Northern Venezuela and northern Colombia
Ligia taiwanensis – Taiwan
Ligia vitiensis – Sulawesi, Singapore, New Guinea, Melanesia, Polynesia, and possibly introduced to Somalia
Ligia yamanishii – Tokyo
Ligia yemenica – Gulf of Aden

References

External links

Woodlice
Isopod genera
Taxa named by Johan Christian Fabricius